"Naïve"/"The Days of Swine & Roses" is a split single released by KMFDM and My Life with the Thrill Kill Kult. "Naïve" is the title track from the KMFDM album Naïve. "The Days of Swine & Roses" originally appeared on the My Life with the Thrill Kill Kult album Confessions of a Knife. An edited version of the Thrill Kill Kult remix of "Naïve" was made into a music video, and reached No. 21 on Billboards Dance/Club Play Songs Chart on March 23, 1991. "The Days of Swine & Roses" was ranked No. 61 on COMA Music Magazines 101 Greatest Industrial Songs of All Time.

Track listing

Original release (early 1991)

Naïve (2008 7" reissue)

References

1991 singles
1991 songs
KMFDM songs
Split singles
Wax Trax! Records singles
My Life with the Thrill Kill Kult songs